Belosynapsis  is a genus of mainly perennial plants in the family Commelinaceae, first described in 1871. It is native to Southeast Asia, the Indian Subcontinent, Papuasia, and southern China.

 Species
 Belosynapsis ciliata (Blume) R.S.Rao – southern China, eastern Himalayas, Indochina, Malaysia, Indonesia, Philippines, New Guinea, Solomon Islands, Vanuatu
 Belosynapsis epiphytica (Blatt.) C.E.C.Fisch. – southern India
 Belosynapsis kawakamii (Hayata) C.I.Peng & Y.J.Chen – Taiwan
 Belosynapsis kewensis Hassk. – southern India
 Belosynapsis moluccana (Roxb.) C.E.C.Fisch. – Malaysia, Indonesia, Philippines, New Guinea
 Belosynapsis vivipara (Dalzell) C.E.C.Fisch. – southern India

References

Commelinaceae
Commelinales genera